In Greek mythology, Dardanus (Dardanos) was a Scythian king, who was the father of Idaea, the second wife of Phineus, the king of Salmydessus in Thrace. After Idaea falsely accused Phineus' sons by his first wife, she was sent back to Dardanus, where he condemned her to death.

The father of Phineus's wife Idaea, has sometimes been confused with, or considered to be the same as the Dardanus who was the son of Zeus and Electra, and ancestor of the Trojans.

Notes

References
 Apollodorus, Apollodorus, The Library, with an English Translation by Sir James George Frazer, F.B.A., F.R.S. in 2 Volumes. Cambridge, MA, Harvard University Press; London, William Heinemann Ltd. 1921.  Online version at the Perseus Digital Library.
 Diodorus Siculus, Diodorus Siculus: The Library of History. Translated by C. H. Oldfather. Twelve volumes. Loeb Classical Library. Cambridge, MA: Harvard University Press; London: William Heinemann, Ltd. 1989. Online version by Bill Thayer.
 Gentili, Alberico, De Armis Romanis, editors: Benedict Kingsbury, Benjamin Straumann, Translated by	David Lupher, OUP Oxford, 2011. .
 Grimal, Pierre, The Dictionary of Classical Mythology, Wiley-Blackwell, 1996, .
 Hazel, John, Michael Grant, Routledge, 2004, .
 Parada, Carlos, Genealogical Guide to Greek Mythology, Jonsered, Paul Åströms Förlag, 1993. .
 Smith, William; Dictionary of Greek and Roman Biography and Mythology, London (1867). Online version at the Perseus Digital Library.
 Tripp, Edward, Crowell's Handbook of Classical Mythology, Thomas Y. Crowell Co; First edition (June 1970). .

Scythian rulers